Streptothrips is a genus of thrips in the family Phlaeothripidae.

Species
 Streptothrips chaberti
 Streptothrips femoralis
 Streptothrips impatiens
 Streptothrips insolitus
 Streptothrips jacoti
 Streptothrips mirabilis
 Streptothrips nudus
 Streptothrips rostratus
 Streptothrips tibialis
 Streptothrips tribulatius

References

Phlaeothripidae
Thrips
Thrips genera
Insects described in 1932
Taxa named by Hermann Priesner